Ryan Lara Trotman (born 27 June 1999) is a professional footballer who plays as a forward for A Lyga club FK Kauno Žalgiris. Born in the Netherlands, he represents Barbados internationally.

Early life
Trotman was born in Enschede, Netherlands, as the son of the Barbadian cricketer Emmerson Trotman and a Dutch mother.

Club career
Born in Enschede, Trotman started his career at Jong FC Twente, making his debut for the club on 6 May 2018 in a 1–1 Eredivisie draw at home to NAC Breda. In July 2019, Trotman signed for FC Den Bosch on a three-year contract.

On 25 January 2022 he signed with lithuanian FK Kauno Žalgiris.

International career
Born in the Netherlands, Trotman was called up to the Barbados national football team for the first time in March 2021, being eligible to represent Barbados through his father. He made his debut on 25 March 2021 in a 1–0 World Cup qualification defeat against Panama.

Career statistics

Club

International

References

External links
 
 

Living people
1999 births
Footballers from Enschede
People with acquired Barbadian citizenship
Barbadian footballers
Barbados international footballers
Dutch footballers
Barbadian people of Dutch descent
Dutch people of Barbadian descent
Association football forwards
FC Twente players
FC Den Bosch players
Eredivisie players
Eerste Divisie players
Derde Divisie players
Barbadian expatriate footballers
Barbadian expatriate sportspeople in Lithuania
Expatriate footballers in Lithuania
Dutch expatriate sportspeople in Lithuania
Dutch expatriate footballers
Jong FC Twente players